Nouriel Roubini (nicknamed "Dr. Doom"; born March 9 1958) is a Turkish-born Iranian-American economic consultant, economist, and writer. He is a Professor Emeritus since 2021 at the Stern School of Business of New York University.

Roubini earned a BA in political economics at Bocconi University in Italy and a doctorate in international economics at Harvard University. He was an academic at Yale and a researcher/advisor and his early research focused on emerging markets. In the 1990s, during the Bill Clinton administration, for one year he was a senior economist in the Council of Economic Advisers, and the following three months he was a senior adviser to Timothy Geithner (who was then the Treasury Department undersecretary for international affairs).

Early life and education
Roubini was born in Istanbul, Turkey, to Iranian Orthodox Jewish parents. His father was a rug dealer; he was expected to go into the rug business himself.  When he was a year old, his family lived briefly in Tehran, Iran. When he was three years old, the family moved to Tel Aviv, Israel; he still has family in Israel. From 1962 when he was five years old to 1983 he lived in Italy, primarily in Milan, where he attended the local Jewish school. He later attended the Hebrew University of Jerusalem in Israel for one year, in 1976-77. He subsequently attended Bocconi University in Italy, earning a B.A. ('82) summa cum laude in economics; in 2009 he was named Bocconian of the Year. He received a Ph.D. in international economics from Harvard University in 1988, where his adviser was Jeffrey Sachs.

Career
For much of the 1990s, Roubini taught at Yale and then in New York, while also working for stints at the International Monetary Fund (briefly, as a summer intern and visiting scholar), and World Bank (briefly, as a consultant). In 1998-99, he worked for one year in the Clinton administration as a senior economist in the Council of Economic Advisers. He worked from July 1999 to October 1999 at the Treasury Department as a senior adviser to Timothy Geithner (who was then the undersecretary for international affairs), and from October 1999 to June 2020 as Director of its Office of Policy Development and Review. Roubini returned to the IMF for July through August 2001 as a visiting scholar. He cowrote a book on saving bankrupt economies entitled, Bailouts or Bail-ins? and started a consulting firm. He said: "One person who has had a great impact on me intellectually was Jeffrey Sachs... Another … is Larry Summers, the former President of Harvard." Currently, he is a professor emeritus at the Stern School of Business at New York University.

Economic forecasts
Roubini says that his economic analysis approach is "holistic." Rather than focus on mathematical models and formulas, he draws his ideas from a combination of history, literature, and international politics, what he calls the "entire enchilada." He also described his approach at an International Monetary Fund meeting, when discussing how he arrived at the percentage likelihood that there would be a recession, by saying: "If you ask me where I got that number: Just out of my nose. I will be very honest about that... my model is like a 'smell test'." Political economist Benjamin Kunkel described his approach as "almost shamanistic."  Journalist Julia Ioffe observed "Roubini-ism-- [is] sprawling, non-linear, and hypercaffeinated-- ... his talking points are ... pluralized, rushing out quickly, like a magician's scarves ...."

Roubini was one of the economists, along with among others economists Dean Baker, Fred Harrison,  Raghuram Rajan, Stephen Roach, and William White, analyst Meredith Whitney, investment advisers Gary Shilling, Peter Schiff, and Marc Faber, and CFTC chair Brooksley Born who predicted the crash of 2007–08. He said: "I've been studying emerging markets for 20 years, and saw the same signs in the U.S. that I saw in them, which was that we were in a massive credit bubble [as 2008 approached]."  He warned about a crisis in an IMF position paper in 2006.

Roubini's predictions earned him the nicknames "Dr. Doom" and "permabear" (economist slang for someone who continually projects downturns) in the media.  In 2008, Fortune magazine wrote, in an article entitled "Eight Who Saw it Coming . . . and eight who didn't," that in 2005 he had said home prices were "riding a speculative wave that would soon sink the economy. Back then the professor was called a Cassandra. Now he's a sage". The New York Times noted that he foresaw "homeowners defaulting on mortgages, trillions of dollars of mortgage-backed securities unraveling worldwide and the global financial system shuddering to a halt". In September 2006, he warned a skeptical IMF that "the United States was likely to face a once-in-a-lifetime housing bust, an oil shock, sharply declining consumer confidence, and, ultimately, a deep recession". Nobel laureate Paul Krugman added in 2009 that his once "seemingly outlandish" predictions were matched "or even exceeded by reality." 

However, financial journalist Justin Fox observed in the Harvard Business Review in 2010 that "In fact, Roubini didn't exactly predict the crisis that began in mid-2007... Roubini spent several years predicting a very different sort of crisis — one in which foreign central banks diversifying their holdings out of Treasuries sparked a run on the dollar — only to turn in late 2006 to warning of a U.S. housing bust and a global 'hard landing'. He still didn't give a perfectly clear or (in retrospect) accurate vision of how exactly this would play out... I'm more than a little weirded out by the status of prophet that he has been accorded since." Others noted that: "The problem is that even though he was spectacularly right on this one, he went on to predict time and time again, as the markets and the economy recovered in the years following the collapse, that there would be a follow-up crisis and that more extreme crashes were inevitable. His calls, after his initial pronouncement, were consistently wrong. Indeed, if you had listened to him, and many investors did, you would have missed the longest bull market run in US market history." Another observed: "For a prophet, he's wrong an awful lot of the time." Tony Robbins wrote: "Roubini warned of a recession in 2004 (wrongly), 2005 (wrongly), 2006 (wrongly), and 2007 (wrongly)" ... and he "predicted (wrongly) that there'd be a 'significant' stock market correction in 2013." Speaking about Roubini, economist Anirvan Banerjee told The New York Times: "Even a stopped clock is right twice a day," and said: " "The average time between recessions is about five years ... So, if you forecast a recession one year and it doesn't happen, and you repeat your forecast year after year ... at some point the recession will arrive." Economist Nariman Behravesh said: "Nouriel Roubini has been singing the doom-and-gloom story for 10 years. Eventually something was going to be right."

In January 2009, Roubini predicted that oil prices would stay below $40 for all of 2009. By the end of 2009, however, oil prices were at $80.  In March 2009, he predicted the S&P 500 would fall below 600 that year, and possibly plummet to 200. It closed at over 1,115 however, up 24%, the largest single-year gain since 2003. CNBC's Jim Cramer wrote that Roubini was "intoxicated" with his own "prescience and vision," and should realize that things are better than he predicted; Roubini called Cramer a "buffoon," and told him to "just shut up". Although in April 2009, Roubini prophesied that the United States economy would decline in the final two quarters of 2009, and that the US economy would increase just 0.5% to 1% in 2010, in fact the U.S. economy in each of those six quarters increased at a 2.5% average annual rate. Then in June 2009 he predicted that what he called a "perfect storm" was just around the corner, but no such perfect storm ever appeared. In 2009 he also predicted that the US government would take over and nationalize a number of large banks; it did not happen. In October 2009 he predicted that the price of gold "can go above $1,000, but it can't move up 20-30%"; he was wrong, as the price of gold rose over the next 18 months, breaking through the $1,000 barrier to over $1,400.  

Although in May 2010 he predicted a 20% decline in the stock market, the S&P actually rose about 20% over the course of the next year (even excluding returns from dividends). In 2012, Roubini predicted that Greece would be ejected from the Eurozone, but that did not happen. The Financial Times observed that in 2020 when the Covid-19 pandemic arrived, he said that policymakers would not mount a large fiscal response. However -- they did. Also in 2020, he predicted that a US-Iran war was likely.

Journalist Alex Pareene called Roubini the "Joe Francis of Pessimism Porn," for writing multiple doomsday columns, including a 2009 column in the Washington Post declaring that unless the U.S. government seized and nationalized all US banks the system would collapse; that was simply untrue, it turned out. By highlighting that  certain of his past predictions were accurate, Roubini has promoted himself as a major figure in the U.S. and international debate about the economy, and spent much of his time shuttling between meetings with central bank governors and finance ministers in Europe and Asia. Although he was ranked only 1,397th in terms of lifetime academic citations in February 2023, he was No. 4 on Foreign Policy magazine's list of the "top 100 global thinkers."  In 2011 and 2012, he was named by the magazine as one of the Top 100 Global Thinkers. In 2013 Roubini was awarded by Global Thinkers Forum its annual Award for Excellence in Global Thinking.

US economy
In the 1990s, Roubini studied the collapse of emerging economies. He used an intuitive, historical approach backed up by a study of theoretical models and came to the conclusion that a common denominator was the large current account deficits financed by loans from abroad. Roubini theorized that the US might be the next to suffer, and in 2004 began writing about a possible future collapse. Business Week magazine writer Michael Mandel, however, noted in 2006 that Roubini and other economists often make general predictions which could happen over multiyear periods.

In 2004 he said that an upcoming recession would lead to the crash of the dollar; when a few years later a recession did come, however, it actually strengthened the dollar. In 2005 after Hurricane Katrina hit the US, Roubini predicted that an economic disaster was imminent; however, the next two years instead saw an increase in financial activity.

In September 2006, he prognosticated the end of the real estate bubble: "When supply increases, prices fall: that's been the trend for 110 years, since 1890. But since 1997, real home prices have increased by about 90 percent. There is no economic fundamental—real income, migration, interest rates, demographics—that can explain this. It means there was a speculative bubble. And now that bubble is bursting." In the Spring 2006 issue of International Finance, he wrote an article titled "Why Central Banks Should Burst Bubbles" in which he argued that central banks should take action against asset bubbles. When asked whether the real estate ride was over, he said, "Not only is it over, it's going to be a nasty fall." By May 2009, he felt that analysts expecting the US economy to rebound in the third and fourth quarter were "too optimistic". He expected the full recession to last 24 or 36 months, and believed in the possibility of an "L-shaped" slow recovery that Japan went through in the Lost Decade.

In his opinion, much of the recession's cause was due to "boom-and-bust cycles," and he felt the US economy needed to find a different growth path in the future. "We've been growing through a period of time of repeated big bubbles," he said. "We've had a model of 'growth' based on overconsumption and lack of savings. And now that model has broken down because we borrowed too much."  He felt that too much human capital went into financing the "most unproductive form of capital, meaning housing" and said he would like to see America create a model of growth in more-productive activities. He felt that "sustainable growth may mean investing slowly in infrastructures for the future, and rebuilding our human capital," by investing in renewable resources. "We don't know what it's going to be," he said, "but it's going to be a challenge to find a new growth model. It's not going to be simple."

In late July 2009, he warned that if no clear exit strategy were outlined and implemented, there was the potential of a "perfect storm": fiscal deficits, rising bond yields, higher oil prices, weak profits, and a stagnant labor market, which combined could "blow the recovering world economy back into a double-dip recession." In August 2009, he predicted that the global economy would begin recovering near the end of 2009, but said the US economy was likely to grow only about 1% annually during the next two years, which would have been less than the three percent normal "trend." He said that the Fed was "now embarked on a policy in which they are in effect directly monetizing about half of the budget deficit," but that now "monetization is not inflationary," as banks were holding much of the money themselves and not relending it. When these attitudes reverse at the end of the recession, that would be time for an "exit strategy, of mopping up that liquidity" and taking some of the money back out of circulation, "so it doesn't just bid up house prices and stock values in a new bubble. And that will be 'very, very tricky indeed,'" he said.

Global economy

2006
In the summer of 2006, Roubini wrote that the U.S. was headed into a long and "protracted" recession due to the "collapse" of house prices, which he noted were already in freefall.

With regards to Europe, Roubini predicted that Italy, and possibly a series of other Eurozone countries (Portugal, Spain, Greece) might have to exit the eurozone if they did not implement "serious economic reforms." "[It] is not a foregone conclusion but, if Italy does not reform, an exit from EMU within 5 years is not totally unlikely. Indeed, like Argentina, Italy faces a growing competitiveness loss given an increasingly overvalued currency and the risk of falling exports and growing current account deficit. The growth slowdown will make the public deficit and debt worse and potentially unsustainable over time. And if a devaluation cannot be used to reduce real wages, the real exchange rate overvaluation will be undone via a slow and painful process of wage and price deflation."

2009
As of January 2009, he remained pessimistic about the U.S. and global economy. He said in September 2008, "we have a subprime financial system, not a subprime mortgage market". "As the U.S. economy shrinks, the entire global economy will go into recession. In Europe, Canada, Japan, and the other advanced economies, it will be severe. Nor will emerging market economies—linked to the developed world by trade in goods, finance, and currency—escape real pain."

Roubini said that the subprime issues were a global, and not just a U.S. problem. In late spring of 2009, he said, "People talk about the American subprime problem, but there were housing bubbles in the U.K., in Spain, in Ireland, in Iceland, in a large part of emerging Europe, like the Baltics all the way to Hungary and the Balkans. It was not just the U.S., and not just 'subprime.' It was excesses that led to the risk of a tipping point in many different economies."

His pessimism is focused on the short-run rather than the medium or long-run. In Foreign Policy (Jan/Feb 2009), he wrote, "Last year's worst-case scenarios came true. The global financial pandemic that I and others had warned about is now upon us. But we are still only in the early stages of this crisis. My predictions for the coming year, unfortunately, are even more dire: The bubbles, and there were many, have only begun to burst".

At a conference in January, 2009, he said, the U.S. banking system was "effectively insolvent." He added that the "systemic banking crisis. ... The problems of Citi, Bank of America and others suggest the system is bankrupt. In Europe, it's the same thing." To deal with this problem, he recommended that the U.S. government "do triage between banks that are illiquid and undercapitalized but solvent, and those that are insolvent. The insolvent ones you have to shut down." He adds, "We're in a war economy. You need command-economy allocation of credit to the real economy. Not enough is being done.".

In December 2009, as the price of gold exceeded $1,200 an ounce, Roubini said it looked "suspiciously like a bubble."  However, by September 2012 gold was trading at $1,700.  He still predicted that it was a risky bet, saying that it would take "another Armageddon" to make the price of gold rise again.

2010
In 2010, he again warned that despite an improved economy with rising stock markets, the crisis was not over and new bubbles were on the horizon: "We are just at the next stage. This is where we move from a private to a public debt problem ... We socialised part of the private losses by bailing out financial institutions and providing fiscal stimulus to avoid the great recession from turning into a depression. But rising public debt is never a free lunch, eventually you have to pay for it."

In late May 2010, markets around the world began dropping due partly to problems in Greece and the Eurozone. "Roubini believes Greece will prove to be just the first of a series of countries standing on the brink," wrote the Telegraph. Roubini spoke about the new issues he felt governments must deal with: "We have to start to worry about the solvency of governments. What is happening today in Greece is the tip of the iceberg of rising sovereign debt problems in the eurozone, in the UK, in Japan and in the US. This ... is going to be the next issue in the global financial crisis.

Roubini met officials in China during spring 2009, and said that many Chinese commentators blamed American "overborrowing and excess" for dragging them into a recession. However, he said that "even they realize that the very excess of American demand has created a market for Chinese exports." He added that although Chinese leaders "would love to be less dependent on American customers and hate having so many of their nation's foreign assets tied up in U.S. dollars," they're now "more worried about keeping Chinese exporters in business. ... I don't think even the Chinese authorities have fully internalized the contradictions of their position."

2011-12
Roubini and political scientist Ian Bremmer described the 21st century world as fragmenting economically and politically, where the "old models of understanding global dynamics are struggling" to keep up with rapid changes. In an article in Foreign Affairs magazine, they described what they called a "G-Zero world," where the United States no longer has the resources to continue as the primary provider of global public goods.  As a result, they said there was likely to be more conflict than cooperation between countries, creating a "zero-sum game," a "game in which my win is your loss." They wrote:

<blockquote>Europe is fully occupied for the moment with saving the eurozone. Japan is likewise tied down with complex political and economic problems at home. None of these powers' governments has the time, resources, or domestic political capital needed for a new bout of international heavy lifting. Meanwhile, there are no credible answers to transnational challenges without the direct involvement of emerging powers such as Brazil, China, and India. Yet these countries are far too focused on domestic development to welcome the burdens that come with new responsibilities abroad.<ref>Bennington, Ash. "Nouriel Roubini on the Origins of the G-Zero World" , CNBC", March 14, 2011</ref></blockquote>

In July 2012, Roubini predicted a global "perfect storm" in 2013, with economies all over the world slowing down or completely halting.

2014-19
By May 2014, Roubini had become bullish, arguing many of the risks to the global economy had receded. He pointed to an improving European economy and stronger euro, steadying of the economy in Japan, and a marked improvement in the United States. He praised the Federal Reserve for its unconventional monetary policy, which he forecast would last for a few more years, supporting equity markets.

At the start of 2017, Roubini speculated that the election of Donald Trump as president might portend a geopolitical shift away from globalization and more toward isolationism, a change which he felt could lead to global instability and rising military conflicts among other countries.

Roubini attacked cryptocurrency in remarks to a U.S. Senate Banking Committee in 2018. That year he was a member of the Berggruen Institute's 21st Century Council.

In November 2019, he wrote "Nine Reasons Why the Stock Markets Are Far Too Optimistic".

2020
On February 17, 2020, he warned of financial vulnerabilities that "could trigger severe economic, financial, political, and geopolitical disturbances unlike anything since the 2008 crisis." Two days later, the market peaked prior to what would become the 2020 stock market crash. Following a relatively minor decrease, Roubini warned on February 24 that the markets were still too complacent about coronavirus, predicting a government response followed by positive market reaction, which would then fizzle.

Cryptocurrencies
He is a frequent critic of cryptocurrencies such as Bitcoin. Roubini tweeted: "99% of crypto land is one shitcoin traded for another shitcoin. And the average shitcoin lost 90% or more of its value in the last year. So Crypto Land is Crap Land, a cesspool of lunatics with severe Freudian scatological obsessions that swim 24/7 in their own stinking shit." 

He views blockchain as "the byword for a libertarian ideology that treats all governments, central banks, traditional financial institutions, and real-world currencies as evil concentrations of power that must be destroyed." He regards cryptocurrencies and blockchain as both utopian and at bottom "about greed" on the part of their promoters. In 2018, he told Ethereum founder Vitalik Buterin to "just shut up."  In 2019, he called BitMEX CEO Arthur Hayes a "sleazy coward," and told him to "shut up."

Consulting business

He formed Roubini Global Economics, a small economic consultancy for financial analysis. He said, "the world is my home, so everything about society and culture—no matter how —is worth knowing. I am an information junkie and created RGE Monitor to collect information about what's happening around the world." As of 2011, the firm was not profitable. Roubini said: "The most important thing in this kind of business is that you have to be right day in and day out. The fact that I made a right call a few years ago doesn't matter." He closed the firm in 2016.

Personal life
Journalist Helaine Olen described Roubini as having "an accent reminiscent of a James Bond villain, and a laugh that seems to kick in on a one-second tape delay." The Financial Times wrote: "when you meet him, his unflinching, unsmiling, uncompromising negativity feels like a break with normal human coping mechanisms." New York Times journalist Stephen Mihm wrote: "With a dour manner and an aura of gloom about him, Roubini gives the impression of being permanently pained.... He rarely smiles, and when he does, his face... contorts into something more closely resembling a grimace."

He speaks English, Persian, Italian, Hebrew, and conversational French.  Roubini likes to refer to himself as a "global nomad", and said, "You can be sitting still surfing the Internet, and experience other worlds, ideas and societies. But I've found that there is nothing better than visiting a different country ...." 

Roubini is a US citizen. He is identified as a Democrat in his profile on Wall Street Economists.  Roubini announced on Twitter in early 2014 his new practice of Transcendental Meditation.

Asked to describe his parties at his apartment, Roubini said: "I look for ten girls to one guy."  He added that his friend Bill Clinton was a fan of this ratio.

When Nick Denton, a journalist and the founder of Gawker, wrote a post labeling Roubini a playboy who lived in a "vulva-" and "vagina-encrusted Tribeca loft", Roubini posted a message on Denton's Facebook page, accusing him of "Nazi-style anti-Semitism"; Denton's mother is Jewish.Nick Denton (October 16, 2008). "'Nick Denton Is An Anti-Semite With A Nazi Mind,'" Gawker. Roubini also called Denton an ignorant antisemite with a Nazi mind, a McCarthyist bigot, and a hypocrite, noted that Denton was gay, accused him of being a stalker, and added: "You are a loser and an intellectual dwarf who cannot engage me on my widely respected views on the economy … too bad [sic] was the first one that early on predicted in minute and precise details this most severe financial crisis." When asked about the exchange by a reporter for The Guardian, Roubini then repeated "the rant, embellishing it with references to the KGB, Denton's sexual orientation, and a sweary suggestion of what the man might do with himself, which he belatedly asks me not to quote.... the piece of art in question is described by Roubini as the work of a highly regarded feminist artist whom he won't name and which doesn't, he assures me, look anything like a vulva." Denton for his part commented: "How can such a brilliant economist, at the height of his reputation, be quite so clueless?" 

Roubini does not want to have children, and cites various global threats as the basis for his position. He also says that: "If stuff happens, I'd rather die than live in a world that is dystopian." He introduces himself to people as "Dr. Doom"; Benjamin Kunkel described him as a human rain cloud with a nickname befitting a comic-book villain.

 Personal investments 
During an interview in June 2009, he was asked about his personal lifestyle expenses and other investments. He said, "I regularly save about 30% of my income. Apart from my mortgage, I don't have any other debts. The credit crunch hasn't affected me much.... I've always lived within my means and, luckily, have never been out of work. I would say I'm a frugal person—I don't have very expensive tastes.... You don't need to spend a lot to enjoy things." Asked whether he invests in stocks, he replied, "Not as much these days. I used to have a lot in equities—about 75%—but over the past three years, I've had about 95% in cash and 5% in equities. You're not getting much from savings these days but earning 0% is better than losing 50%.... I don't believe in picking individual stocks or assets.... Never invest your money as though you are gambling at the casino. Buying and selling individual stocks is a waste of time."

Writings
 2022: MegaThreats: Ten Dangerous Trends That Imperil Our Future, And How to Survive Them, Little Brown
 2010: Crisis Economics: A Crash Course in the Future of Finance, Penguin Press
 2006: (editor with Marc Uzan) New International Financial Architecture, Edward Elgar Publishing
 2004: (with Brad Setzer) Bailouts or Bail-ins? Responding to Financial Crises in Emerging Economies, Peterson Institute
 1997: (with Alberto Alesina & Gerald D. Cohen) Political Cycles and the Macroeconomy, MIT Press

Research
 International macroeconomics and international finance
 Macroeconomics and fiscal policy

References

External links

 
 Nouriel Roubini at Stern School of Business, New York University
 Column archive at Project Syndicate
 Roubini and Ian Bremmer discuss outlook for 2013 Reuters TV'', January 14, 2013, video, 1 hr. and 11 min.
 

1958 births
Living people
21st-century American economists
American consulting businesspeople
American economics writers
American male non-fiction writers
American management consultants
American Mizrahi Jews
American people of Iranian-Jewish descent
Bocconi University alumni
Businesspeople from Milan
Clinton administration personnel
Harvard University alumni
Hebrew University of Jerusalem alumni
International finance economists
Iranian emigrants to Israel
Iranian emigrants to Italy
Iranian emigrants to the United States
Iranian expatriate academics
Iranian Jews
Jewish American social scientists
Jewish American writers
Macroeconomists
New York University Stern School of Business faculty
Scientists from Milan
United States Council of Economic Advisers
United States Department of the Treasury officials
Writers about globalization
Writers from Milan
Yale University faculty